Central Bukidnon Institute is a private school located in Bagontaas, Valencia City, Bukidnon. It offers complete secondary course which copes up from junior to senior highschool programs. It serves more than over 500 students primarily from the location itself. Central Bukidnon Institute is owned and operated privately by the OM Bulahan family and is affiliated with the Seventh-Day Adventist Church. It is one of the prominent self-supporting institutions of the Seventh-Day Adventist Church.

History
Mr. and Mrs. Emilio Gequillana, donated one hectare to the school Central Bukidnon Institute to open its doors on the school year 1967–1968, on its answer to the need of a secondary school. On its first year of opening of the school, it has 75 first year students and 2 teachers, Mr. Orville Bulahan, the present principal of the institution. and Mrs. Polecena Garin-Opao. The school held its first graduation exercises in 1971, with 47 senior students, 4 years after the school opens its doors. The school has a Pathfinder Club which covers up students from the first year and second year.

Philosophy
We believe that each person must face the practical realities of life - its opportunities, its responsibilities, its defects, its successes. How he is to meet this experiences, whether he is to become master or victim of circumstances, depends largely upon his preparation to cope with them - his education. The source of such an education is brought to view in this words of Holy Writ, pointing to the Infinite One: In Him "are hid all treasures of wisdom." (Colossians 2:3) "He hath counsel and understanding, Job 12:13". In a knowledge of God all true knowledge and real development have their source.

Student life

The school's experience is shaped by many events and extra curricular activities, including the following:

 Vespers, church, and other worship services
 Week of Prayer
 Student Association Days
 Student Historian Club
 Breakthrough Science Club
 School Band
 Pathfinder Club
 Choir/CBI Chorale
 CBI Ensemble
 CBI Musicals
 Outreach groups
 Linggo ng Wika
 United Nations Celebration
 Local Science Fair
 CVAPSAA and City Games
 Junior and Senior's night

School anthem

CBI Alma Mater Song

(Words and Music by: Catalino Rama)

"O'er the plains and mountains of fair Bukidnon

Where we hear the sweet strains of youth happy songs;

CBI beams brightly bearing e'er the banner high,

School that prepares for Christ's soon coming;

that leads to home beyond the skies.

Refrain:

CBI dear CBI, Alma Mater thee we praise!

We'll uphold thy standard high! Loyal we shall ever be;

'Tis our hope and prayer God grant thee prosperity,

and our bond shall ne'er be broken 'til we reach eternity!

Oh we love to study of God's Holy Word;

blessed wisdom arms us against the foes of truth;

onward sing with courage, God our Guide beside us stands!

May our school, our Alma Mater

flourish till our race is won!"

See also

 List of Seventh-day Adventist secondary and elementary schools
 Seventh-day Adventist education
 Seventh-day Adventist Church
 Seventh-day Adventist theology
 History of the Seventh-day Adventist Church

References
http://www.adventist.org

High schools in the Philippines
Adventist secondary schools in the Philippines
Schools in Bukidnon
Education in Valencia, Bukidnon